Summit Public Schools is a charter management organization (CMO) with eight schools in the San Francisco Bay Area and three schools in Washington state. Summit operates eleven schools in total, enrolling approximately 2,000 students. The headquarters is located in Redwood City, California.

Summit is the recipient of grant from the Bill and Melinda Gates Foundation. 

Summit Rainier was closed for good in 2020.

Summit Denali is set to close after the 2022-2023 school year. This was due to insufficient funds, however parents and students were told of this after school application deadlines, thus leaving them sufficiently unprepared for their child's future. Students, teachers, and parents were all outraged with the events with the teachers protesting outside middle school and high school in the morning. Meanwhile, in the last couple years, the salary of CEO Diane Tavanner has increased by 200% up to a massive $450,000 a year, while still open schools such as Tahoma accumulate deficit. The board meeting, which would announce the close of Summit Denali, was in addition scheduled during a time, when most students were at school, learning.

Schools
 Summit Preparatory Charter High School in Redwood City, CA
 Everest Public High School in Redwood City, CA
 Summit Tahoma in South San Jose, CA
 Summit K2 in El Cerrito, CA
 Summit Shasta in Daly City, CA
 Summit Tamalpais in Richmond, CA
 Summit Denali in Sunnyvale, CA
 Summit Olympus in Tacoma, WA
 Summit Sierra in Seattle, WA
 Summit Atlas in West Seattle, WA

Summit Learning
The pedagogy employed at Summit schools, dubbed "Summit Learning," is a personalized, project-based learning (PBL) curriculum that puts students "in charge" of their own learning.

Courses are built around projects done at students' own paces instead of traditional coursework modules, and teachers focus their energy on tutoring individual students as many grading functions are automated.

References

Further reading

Charter schools in the United States
Public education in California
Organizations based in the San Francisco Bay Area
Charter management organizations